Los Cerritos is a corregimiento in Los Pozos District, Herrera Province, Panama with a population of 985 as of 2010. Its population as of 1990 was 937; its population as of 2000 was 1,010.

References

Corregimientos of Herrera Province